Tim Donnelly may refer to:

 Tim Donnelly (actor) (1944–2021), American actor
 Tim Donnelly (politician) (born 1966), American politician, member of Republican Party
 Tim Donnelly (rugby union) (born 1980), rugby player in Australia

See also
 Timothy Donnelly (born 1969), American poet